The Casselman Bridge is an historic transportation structure on the Casselman River, located immediately east of Grantsville in Garrett County, Maryland. The bridge was built in 1813-1814 as part of the National Road. Historic markers posted at each end read:

Since 1957, the structure, which has also been known as Casselmans Bridge, Castleman's Bridge, and Little Crossings Bridge, has been preserved by the state of Maryland as Casselman River Bridge State Park. The bridge was declared a National Historic Landmark in 1964, and placed on the National Historic Register in 1966.

History
The bridge was constructed in 1813–1814 to aid in the westward movement through the frontier wilderness west of Cumberland, Maryland. The first wheeled vehicles crossed the bridge in 1815. As a "tidal wave" of western expansion followed the opening of the National Road, Casselman Bridge had heavy traffic that included 10-ton loads drawn by 12-horse teams. A small portion of the original National Road still exists at the approaches to the bridge.

The bridge was strengthened for motorized traffic in 1911 and continued in service as a highway until 1933, when a modern steel span was built nearby to serve what is now US Route 40 Alternate. In the 1940s and early 1950s, efforts were made to preserve the bridge when sections started to crumble and fall apart. The bridge was closed to vehicles in 1953 and partially restored by the state in the mid-1950s. Additional maintenance occurred in 1979, 1996, 2002, and 2012.

Activities and amenities
In addition to walking over the historic bridge, the state park offers picnicking facilities and fishing in Casselman River. Historic structures to the east of the park include Stanton's Mill, which is listed on National Register of Historic Places, and the restored log cabin craft shops of Spruce Forest Artisan Village.

See also
Buckel's Bog
Maryland bridges documented on the Historic American Engineering Record
Maryland bridges on the National Register of Historic Places
List of National Historic Landmarks in Maryland
National Register of Historic Places listings in Garrett County, Maryland

References

External links

Casselman River Bridge State Park Maryland Department of Natural Resources
Inventory No. G-II-C-014: Casselman Bridge, National Road (various documents) Maryland State Archives

, including photo from 1996, at Maryland Historical Trust

Parks in Garrett County, Maryland
State parks of the Appalachians
National Historic Landmarks in Maryland
Road bridges on the National Register of Historic Places in Maryland
Bridges completed in 1813
State parks of Maryland
Transportation buildings and structures in Garrett County, Maryland
Pedestrian bridges in Maryland
Former road bridges in the United States
Historic American Buildings Survey in Maryland
Historic American Engineering Record in Maryland
National Road
National Register of Historic Places in Garrett County, Maryland
Stone arch bridges in the United States
Protected areas established in 1957